The Isuzu Cup, also known as the Isuzu Tournament, or the Isuzu Cup Tournament is an 8-man Muay Thai tournament which takes place at Siam Omnoi Stadium in Samut Sakhon every year. The tournament is organized by the Tri-Petch Group, owned by Isuzu Motors Ltd., and sanctioned by the Sports Authority of Thailand. It is well-known as one of the best and the longest-standing tournament still active in the sport of Muay Thai.

History 
The first Isuzu tournament started in late 1990. The final took place in early 1991 where Rattananoi Tansarinkhan won a decision over Weesanusak Wor.Weerakul.

In 2011, as the Tri-Petch Group became a sponsor of the new Thai Fight promotion, which aims for higher-weight talent, the tournament weight was raised to over 135 lbs for the first time. The winner of the Isuzu Cup, Kem Sitsongpeenong was entered into the second edition of the Thai Fight Tournament, which he ultimately won against Fabio Pinca, the winner of the first Thai Fight Tournament in 2010.

In 2012, the format was slightly changed as the winner of the Isuzu Tournament would have to participate in the Isuzu Cup Super Fight in order to qualify for the Thai Fight Tournament.

Many Muay Thai fans have criticized the tournament weight since the start of the partnership with Thai Fight as the lower divisions are generally considered to have stronger competition.

Tournament progression 
The Isuzu Cup Tournament is divided into three stages, starting with the Group Stage, in which the eight participants are divided into two groups accordingly called Group A and B. Each fighters has to fight all of the other members in his group and accumulate points before being able to move onto the next stage. The point system:

 0 points for a loss
 1 point for a draw
 2 points for a decision win
 3 points for a (technical) knockout win or decision win with a big cut on the opponent

The two fighters with the most points in each group will move on to the second stage, the Semi-finals, where it will be:

 Group A winner vs Group B runner-up
 Group B winner vs Group A runner-up

The third, and last stage is the tournament Final, which pits the winners of the Semi-finals against each other.

Prize 
As of 2020:

 The Isuzu Cup champion is awarded ฿1,000,000 Thai baht, and an Isuzu D-Max pickup truck. Additionally, they will have to participate in the Isuzu Cup Super Fight.
 The runner-up is awarded ฿500,000 Thai baht.
 Third place is awarded ฿300,000 Thai baht, and fourth place is awarded ฿200,000 Thai baht.

Tournament Winners

Rules 
The tournament is conducted in Sports Authority of Thailand Muay Thai rules:

 Each fight consists of 5 rounds of 3 minutes with 2-minute breaks between each round.
 Fights can be won by decision, knockout, or technical knockout.

References 

Muay Thai competitions in Thailand